Egyptian Maus are a small to medium-sized short-haired cat breed. They are one of the few naturally spotted breeds of domesticated cat. The spots of the Mau occur on only the tips of the hairs of its coat. It is considered a rare breed.

Characteristics
Egyptian Maus are considered by proponents to be one of the progenitor breeds of the modern domestic cat. The breed conformation is described as "a balance between the compactness of a Burmese and the slim elegance of a Siamese. Its medium-length body is muscular, with the hind legs longer than the front, giving the Mau the appearance of standing on tiptoes when upright."  

The Egyptian Mau is the fastest of the domestic cats, with its longer hind legs, and unique flap of skin extending from the flank to the back knee, which assists in running by allowing the legs to stretch back farther, providing for greater agility and length of stride.

One of the most important recognizable traits of this breed is a long, dark, dorsal stripe that runs from its head to its tail along its spine.

Maus come in six colours. From most to least common, these colours are silver, bronze, smoke, black, caramel and blue/pewter. Black and pewter Maus cannot be shown, but may be used in breeding. All Maus must have green eyes, but an amber cast is acceptable in kittens and young adults up to eighteen months old.

The Mau is known for having what is considered a loyal, playful and friendly personality. Maus are more temperature sensitive than most breeds—they are fond of very warm temperatures. 

Maus have an unusually long gestational period, about 73 days. The maximum normal period for cats is 65–67 days, although Siamese may take a day or two longer.

Maus often possess very musical voices. They are known to chirp, chortle, and emit other distinctly unusual vocalizations when stimulated. Another behavior, quite common in happy Maus, has been described as "wiggle-tail." The cat, whether female or male, wiggles and twitches its tail, and appears to be marking territory, also known as spraying, but during this behavior the Mau is not releasing urine. 

Facial expressions may change according to mood, and eye colour may change from green to turquoise.

Origins

Historical evidence points to the Mau being an Egyptian breed. The feline genome data published in the Pentascope document shows the Egyptian Mau to be very closely related to the Maine Coon, Korat, and American Turkish Angoras (not distinguishable from native Turkish Angoras). The phylogenetic tree published in PlosOne demonstrates that the Egyptian Mau belongs to the group of Western-derived breeds. The East Mediterranean/Anatolian group is omitted because breeds that supposedly originate in that geographic area do not do so.

 
The Mau achieved championship status in some organizations in 1968. There were attempts by British breeders to create Maus from cross-breeds of Abyssinians, Siamese and tabbies, however, these did not resemble the true Maus. This mix became the basis for the Ocicat.

Egyptian Maus will have either a "scarab beetle" or "M" marking on their foreheads. Those with the latter tend to be from the United States.

A Bengal breeder named Jean Mill also made some contributions to the breed.

Rarity
Egyptian Maus are a relatively rare breed in the UK. Fewer than 200 kittens are registered with the Governing Council of the Cat Fancy each year. Not all Mau kittens are registered.

Egyptian Mau Rescue Organization and export
The Egyptian Mau Rescue Organization (EMRO) was an agency for the adoption, both locally and internationally, of tame Maus born in the Middle East. Supported solely by private and corporate donors, EMRO aimed to increase education in Egypt and around the world about the cats. It closed in 2017.

EMRO's cats are not pedigreed Egyptian Maus; they are Egyptian and Arabian street cats of unrecorded pedigree that come from the Mau's region of landrace origin. Breed registries will not consider these cats and their immediate offspring as Egyptian Maus. Establishing later offspring as pedigreed Egyptian Maus requires detailed record-keeping to verify parentage, and examination of the cats to ensure they meet a number of exacting breed standard conformation requirements to rule out disqualifying physical traits. For example, the Cat Fanciers' Association (CFA) will consider the first generation of imported cats to be native Maus; their second- and third-generation offspring (derived from the same imported stock and/or bred to CFA-pedigreed Egyptian Maus – they must not be out-bred to any other breed) are considered domestic Maus. Finally, the fourth generation cats are eligible for placement on the active registry as formal Egyptian Mau breed specimens, provided they have been evaluated fully and approved by a designated representative of the Egyptian Mau Breed Council as conformant.

See also

Arabian Mau

References

Specific

General

External links

Egyptian Mau at DMOZ

Cat breeds
Cat breeds originating in Egypt
Natural cat breeds